This is a list of roll-on/roll-off vessels involved in maritime incidents and accidents.

References

RORO